Annadanapuram  is a village in the Nannilam taluk of Tiruvarur district in Tamil Nadu, India.

Demographics 

As per the 2001 census, Annadanapuram had a population of 1,706 with 845 males and 861 females. The sex ratio was 1019. The literacy rate was 81.31.

References 

 

Villages in Tiruvarur district